Webzen is a South Korean developer and publisher of video games. The company, together with its subsidiaries, also engages in software licensing and related services all over the world.

History
Webzen merged with NHN Games, which was dissolved with the merger on July 7, 2010. Webzen acquired Ymir Games on January 26, 2011 and became the owner of Metin2.

The company's line-up of games includes other new titles such as Archlord 2, MU: eX 700 - MU Online's first expansion, Continent of the Ninth (C9): PvP Global Championship and the first of a kind MU World Championship 2011.

On July 1, 2012, global service of C9 began. With the release of C9, Webzen announced the C9 and Arctic Combat World Championship will start, where players around the world compete to be the best in the games. The finals were held at G-Star 2012 Expo on November 10, 2012.

In December 6, 2012, the global service for Arctic Combat started. The Steam service for Arctic Combat was also included. This service was shut down in 2013.

Business model
Webzen games are free-to-play, but uses a micropayment system to generate revenue. Wcoins are the optional virtual currency that is purchased with real life money in order to purchase virtual goods that are used in Webzen Games.

References

Companies established in 2000
Entertainment companies of South Korea
Video game companies of South Korea
Software companies of South Korea
Video game development companies
Video game publishers